Antônio de Sena Madureira (1841–1889) was a lieutenant colonel of the Brazilian army who fought in the Paraguayan War (1864–1870) and ended up becoming a prisoner of war of the Paraguayan troops under Francisco Solano López.

Post-war events
In 1883, a group of military officers attacked a government project that intended to revise military retirement laws. With the criticism, the government withdrew from its decision and requested the cancellation of the project. On the other hand, the government also vetoed military use of the media to attack institutions or authorities of the Empire. In response to this reprimand, Sena Madureira published a text in which he greeted Francisco José do Nascimento, a raftsman from Ceará who refused to transport slaves to a slave ship. In complimenting Nascimento, Sena Madureira expressed his clear disgust for the slave system sustained by the Empire. In response, the government determined his transference from the capital to Rio Grande do Sul.

Legacy
The city of Sena Madureira in Acre is named after him. There is also a street in São Paulo called Sena Madureira.

References

1841 births
1889 deaths
Brazilian abolitionists
People from Recife
Brazilian military personnel of the Paraguayan War
19th-century Brazilian military personnel